National Route 456 is a national highway of Japan connecting Morioka, Iwate and Motoyoshi, Miyagi in Japan, with a total length of 154.5 km (96 mi).

References

National highways in Japan
Roads in Iwate Prefecture
Roads in Miyagi Prefecture